Presidential Physics and Mathematics Lyceum No. 239, is a public high school in Saint Petersburg, Russia that specializes in mathematics and physics. The school opened in 1918 and it became a specialized city school in 1961. The school is noted for its strong academic programs. It is the alma mater of numerous winners of International Mathematical Olympiads and it has produced many notable alumni. The lyceum has been named the best school in Russia in 2015, 2016, and 2017.

History 
The school was founded in 1918. Originally, it was located in the Lobanov-Rostovsky Palace, also known as "house with lions" at the corner of Saint Isaac's Square and Admiralteysky Prospect. It was one of only handful of schools to remain open during Siege of Leningrad. In 1961 the school was granted status of city's school with specialization in physics and mathematics. In 1964 the school moved to the building on Kazansky Street 48/1, which was previously occupied by school of working youth, and in 1966 it moved again to Moika River, 108. Finally, in 1975 the school relocated to its current location, into the historic Annenschule building.
In 1990, the Russian Ministry of Education granted school the status of physico-mathematical lyceum and experimental laboratory for standard of education in physics, mathematics and informatics in Saint Petersburg. In 1994, the school won the George Soros grant. The US Mathematical society voted the school as one of top ten schools of former Soviet Union. The first of January 2014 the school received a status of "Presidential Physics and Mathematics Lyceum №239".

Famous alumni 

 Yelena Bonner (1940) – human rights activist (widow of Andrei Sakharov)
 Leonid Kharitonov – actor
 Alisa Freindlich (c. 1942 – 1953) – major Russian movie and theater actress
 Yuri Matiyasevich (1962–1963) – mathematician who solved Hilbert's tenth problem
 Andrei Tolubeyev (?–1963) – theatrical and cinema actor, People's Artist of Russia
 Natalia Kuchinskaya (1964–1966) – Olympic champion in gymnastics (Mexico City, 1968), the first of a number of young gymnastics champions
 Boris Grebenshchikov (1968–1970) – rock musician, who is one of the "founding fathers" of Russian rock music
 Mikhail Zurabov (?–1970) – minister of health of the Russian Federation, chair of the Russian pension fund administration
 Sergey Fursenko – businessman, president of the football club Zenit Saint Petersburg
 Grigori Perelman (1980–1982) – mathematician who was awarded Fields Medal for his proof of the Poincaré conjecture
 Alexander Khalifman (1981–1983) – FIDE World Chess champion in 1999
 Stanislav Smirnov (1985–1987) – mathematician and recipient of Fields Medal in 2010 for his work on the mathematical foundations of statistical physics, particularly finite lattice models

Directors of the School 
 Matkovskaya Maria Vasilievna - from 1950 to 1976
 Radionov Victor Evseevich - from 1976 to 1980
 Golubeva Galina Nikolaevna - from 1980 to 1982
 Efimova Tamara Borisovna - from 1982 to 2009
 Pratusevich Maxim Yakovlevich - since 2009

References 

 Official web site of Lyceum 239
 History of physico-mathematical lyceum #239 (in Russian)

Schools in Saint Petersburg
Educational institutions established in 1918
Mathematics education
Physics education
Lyceums in Russia
1918 establishments in Russia